Carl Magnus Craelius (1773-1842), was a Swedish opera singer (tenor) and voice teacher.  He was a member of the Royal Swedish Academy of Music (1822).  He was engaged at the Royal Swedish Opera in 1795-1806.  He is known as the mentor of several later famous singers, most notably Jenny Lind.

References 

 Crælius, Karl Magnus i Nordisk familjebok (andra upplagans supplement, 1923)

1773 births
1842 deaths
18th-century Swedish male opera singers
19th-century Swedish male opera singers